The 2013 Judo Grand Prix Düsseldorf was held in Düsseldorf, Germany from 23 to 24 February 2013.

Medal summary

Men's events

Women's events

Source Results

Medal table

References

External links
 

2013 IJF World Tour
2013 Judo Grand Prix
Judo
Judo competitions in Germany
Judo
Judo